The Stavros Niarchos Foundation Cultural Center is a complex in the bay of Faliro in Athens which includes new facilities for the National Library of Greece (NLG) and the Greek National Opera (GNO), as well as the  Stavros Niarchos Park. The center was designed by architect Renzo Piano and its construction was funded by the Stavros Niarchos Foundation. The $861 million project was completed in 2016, and was donated to the Greek state in 2017.

The project
Plans for a big scale donation by the Stavros Niarchos Foundation started in 1998. Initially the foundation planned to make separate donations to the National Library and the National Opera. In 2006 it was decided to build one complex for both organizations and after discussions with the Greek state the area of the former horse racing (Hippodrome) track was chosen. In 2008 the foundation chose Italian architect Renzo Piano to design the complex and in 2012 construction works started.

The building

Renzo Piano envisaged the SNFCC rising out of the ground like a dislodged piece of the earth's crust. As a result, an artificial hill is constructed and the roof of both the library and the opera house is emerging from it maintaining the slope. The library is lower and the ‘hill’ concludes with the opera house. The roof of the library will be covered with ground material  and planted with indigenous Greek plants. On top of the opera house there will be a canopy supported on thin steel columns. According to Piano, "the canopy represents a cloud hovering over the highest point of the hill". The roof of the building is covered with a 100x100 meter photovoltaic field, generating around 3 GWh per year. The roof is suspended with dampers to increase its resilience during hurricanes.

The design for the National Opera includes a 1,400-seat opera auditorium and a 400-seat black box theatre.

The SNFCC was nominated for the international prize for architecture, RIBA International Prize 2018, awarded by the Royal Institute of British Architects. It is the only Greek nominee among 62 buildings in 30 countries.

Other information
During his visit to Athens, Greece (November 15–16, 2016), the former US President Barack Obama gave a speech at the Stavros Niarchos Foundation Cultural Center, covering the impact of democracy.

Plans for the Athens Metro to reach Stavros Niarchos Foundation Cultural Center were announced in 2021.

References

Leonidas Kourmadas (7 February 2014). "Athens building its modern-day Acropolis". gbtimes.com. Retrieved 17 June 2014
 Γιώργος Λάλιος (10 June 2014). "Στο μεγαλύτερο έργο της Αθήνας". Καθημερινή. Retrieved 17 June 2014

External links

Stavros Niarchos Foundation Cultural Center official website

Buildings and structures in Athens
Culture in Athens
Opera houses in Greece
National Library of Greece
Buildings and structures completed in 2016
Modernist architecture in Greece
2016 establishments in Greece